The following newspapers have been or are printed in the Chicago metropolitan area.

Daily newspapers
 The Beacon-News. Aurora
 Chicago Sun-Times, 1948–present
 Chicago Tribune, 1847–present
 The Courier-News, Elgin
 Daily Herald
 Daily Southtown, 1906–present
 The Herald-News 
 Hoy
 Kane County Chronicle
 Naperville Sun
 News Sun, 1892–present
 Northwest Herald
 Post-Tribune

Weekly newspapers
 Chicago Defender, 1905–present (daily between 1956-2003) 
 Chicago Reader, 1972–present
 Newcity
 Sanghamam, 2001–present
 South Side Weekly

Past

 Chicago American, 1900–1939, became Herald-American
 Chicago Chronicle, 1895–1908
 Chicago Courier, 1874–1876
 Chicago Daily News, 1876–1978
 Chicago Daily Telegraph, 1878–1881 (became Chicago Morning Herald)
 Chicago Daily Times, 1929–1948 (merged with Chicago Sun to form Chicago Sun-Times)
 Chicago Democrat, 1833–1861
 Chicago Democratic Press, 1852–1857
 Chicago Evening Mail, 1870–1875 (became Post & Mail)
 Chicago Evening Post, 1865–1875 (became Post & Mail)
 Chicago Evening Post, 1886-1932 (absorbed by Chicago Daily News)
 Chicago Evening Press & Mail, 1884–1897
 Chicago Examiner, 1902–1918 (became Herald-Examiner)
 Chicago Express, 1842–1843
 Chicago Globe, 1887–1895
 Chicago Herald, 1881–1918
 Chicago Herald-American, 1939–1958 (became Chicago's American)
 Chicago Herald-Examiner, 1918–39 (became Herald-American)
 Chicago Journal, 1844–1929 (absorbed by Chicago Daily News)
 Chicago Mail, 1885–1894
 Chicago Morning News, 1881 (became Chicago Record)
 Chicago Morning Herald, 1893–1901 (became Record-Herald)
 Chicago Post, 1890–1929 (absorbed by Daily News)
 Chicago Record, 1881–1901
 Chicago Record Herald, 1901–1914
 Chicago Republican, 1865–1872 (became Chicago Inter Ocean)
 Chicago Sun, 1941–1948 (merged with Chicago Daily Times to form Chicago Sun-Times)
 Chicago Times, 1861–1895 (became Times-Herald)
 Chicago Times-Herald, 1895–1901 (became Record-Herald)
 Chicago Whip, 1919–1939
 Chicago's American, 1958–1969 (became Today)
 Chicago Inter Ocean, 1872–1914 (became Record-Herald)
 Chicago Post & Mail, 1875–1878 (absorbed by Chicago Daily News)
 Today, 1969–1974
 City News Bureau of Chicago, local cooperative wire service

Chicago weekly community newspapers
 Ashburn Independent
 Austin Voice
 Austin Weekly News
 Beverly News
 Beverly Review
 Brighton Park/McKinley Park Life
 Bridgeport News
 Bulgaria SEGA Newspaper (Bulgarian Community Newspaper - Est 2005)
 Shoreland News
 Chicago Citizen Newspapers
 Chicago Independent Bulletin
 Chicago Journal
 Chicago Standard
 Clear Ridge Reporter
 Exito
 Extra Bilingual Community Newspaper
 The Garfield Lawndale Voice
 The Gazette
 The Gate
 Greek Star
 Hi India Weekly
 Hyde Park Herald
 India Bulletin
 Inside-Booster
 Korean News
 Korean Times
 Journal News
 La Raza
 La Voz de Chicago
 La Voz del Paseo Boricua
 Lawndale News
 Mt. Greenwood Express
 Our Neighborhood Times
 News-Star
 North Lawndale Community News
 Northwest Leader-Post
 Northwest Side Press
 Polish Daily News
 Reporter/Journal
 Sauganash Sounds
 Scottsdale Independent
 Skyline
 Southeast Chicago Observer
 South Street Journal
 Ukrainske Slovo Newspaper (Ukrainian Community Newspaper - Est 2002)
 Southwest Courier
 Southwest News Herald
 Windy City Times (GLBT)

Suburban community newspapers 

 Desplaines Valley News
 Evanston Roundtable
 Evanston Sentinel
 Forest Park Review
 Journal-Topics Newspapers
 Lombardian
 Lombard Spectator
 Niles Bugle
 Pioneer Press
 Saint Charles Republican
 Suburban Life newspapers
 Tri-City Journal
 22nd Century Media
 Wednesday Journal

Past community newspapers
 Back-of-Yards Journal
 Citizen, 1900s–1930
 Chatham Citizen, 1965-1975 
 Edison Review
 Life 
 Chicago Free Press (GLBT, 1999-2010)
 Gay Chicago
 Gay Life (GLBT, 1970s-80s)
 North Loop News
 Near North News
 New Metro News
 Norwood Review
 Brookfield Enterprise / The Times (1932-1985)
 Residents' Journal
 River North News
 The Skeleton News
 Times, 1950s–2005
 Uptown Action, 1980-1985
 Westside Journal
 West Town Chicago Journal
 West Town Free Press (West Town Tenants Union) (1997-2002)
 Voice

Specialized local newspapers
 Bar Fly
 Catholic New World, bi-weekly newspaper for the Archdiocese of Chicago
 Chicago Computer Guide
 Chicago Daily Law Bulletin
 Chicago Educator
 Chicago Journal of Commerce and Daily Financial Times, 1920-1923 (became Chicago Journal of Commerce and LaSalle Street Journal)
 Chicago Journal of Commerce and LaSalle Street Journal, 1923-1950 (purchased by Wall Street Journal and became Chicago Edition of the Wall Street Journal)
 Chicago Parent
 Chicago Reporter
 Chicago Sports Weekly
 Chicago Suburban Family
 Crain's Chicago Business
 Outlines
 PerformInk
 Spark (U.S. organization)
 StreetWise, 1992–present

See also
List of newspapers in Illinois

References